An interim leader, in Canadian politics, is a party leader appointed by the party's legislative caucus or the party's executive to temporarily act as leader when a gap occurs between the resignation or death of a party leader and the election of their formal successor. Usually a party leader retains the leadership until a successor is formally chosen — however, in some situations this is not possible, and an interim leader is thus appointed by the party's caucus or the party executive. An interim leader may also be appointed while a leader is on a leave of absence due to poor health or some other reason, and then relinquish the position upon the leader's return.

An interim leader has all the rights and responsibilities of an elected party leader, with the exception that the person does not have the discretion to choose the timing of their departure — an interim leader serves only until the party organizes and holds a leadership convention. By virtue of lacking a mandate from the party membership, however, an interim leader is not generally seen as possessing the authority to truly put his or her own ideological and organizational stamp on the party, and is thus effectively limited to a caretaker role in most cases.

There have been a number of instances where instead of a competitive leadership race between multiple candidates, the leadership convention directly ratified the interim leader as the party's new permanent leader, but a convention must still take place in some form.

By convention, if a competitive leadership race between sitting members of the party's caucus is taking place, the interim leader should be a caucus member who is not standing as a candidate in the leadership race, so they do not gain unfair advantage in the contest. Only in rare exceptions, such as when a minor party whose interim leader is also its only caucus member in the legislature or when no no other caucus colleagues are competing for the leadership positions; with rare exceptions, will an interim leader stand as a candidate for permanent leadership.

An interim leader may, if necessary, lead the party into an election, but by Canadian custom, an election is usually not called while one of the parties is in a leadership race.

An interim leader may also assume political roles that would be held by a permanent leader of their party. For instance, if a prime minister or a provincial premier dies in office or resigns suddenly, the interim leader chosen to succeed them also becomes interim prime minister or premier.

Practice
In most circumstances, a leader who has decided to step down gives extended notice, and a leadership convention is organized to choose their successor. The outgoing leader remains in the position for the duration of the leadership campaign, and then hands over power to the successor shortly after the convention.

However, sudden vacancies may occur for a variety of reasons.

Death in office
Wilfrid Laurier died in 1919, while holding the leadership of the Liberal Party. Daniel Duncan McKenzie was selected as the party's interim leader, serving until William Lyon Mackenzie King was selected as the party's leader later in the year.

Jack Layton initially took a leave of absence from the leadership of the New Democratic Party in 2011 for cancer treatment, and Nycole Turmel was named the interim leader of the party; Layton died before his intended date of return to office, and Turmel continued as interim leader pending the results of the 2012 leadership election.

Scandal
Glen Clark was forced to resign the leadership of the British Columbia New Democratic Party, and the premiership, after a criminal investigation against him was announced. He was succeeded by Dan Miller, who served until Ujjal Dosanjh won the resulting leadership convention.

Creation of a new party
In 2000, after the Reform Party was folded into the new Canadian Alliance, Deborah Grey served as the party's interim leader until the party's first leadership convention selected Stockwell Day. Similarly, after the Canadian Alliance and the Progressive Conservatives merged in 2003, Senator John Lynch-Staunton was named interim leader of the new Conservative Party until the first leadership convention selected Stephen Harper.

Internal dissension
In 1983, Joe Clark received only 66.9 per cent support in an internal leadership review process conducted by the Progressive Conservative Party. Feeling that he did not have sufficiently strong support within the party, he thus scheduled a leadership convention. Initially, he remained the party's leader in the meantime — however, as he was also standing as a candidate in the leadership process, he eventually stepped down and Erik Nielsen was installed as the party's interim leader.

In early 2002, Stockwell Day's leadership of the Canadian Alliance came under criticism due to party infighting. Like Clark, he thus announced a new leadership campaign in which he would reoffer as a candidate, and John Reynolds became the party's interim leader.

Leader defeated in an election
In several cases, a party's leader has been defeated in his or her own riding in an election, and has resigned soon afterward. A resignation is not necessarily required in such a scenario, as other leaders in the same situation have retained the leadership until they were able to run in a by-election. However, for personal or political reasons some leaders have opted to immediately resign the leadership instead.

Andy Brandt became interim leader of the Ontario Progressive Conservative Party following the party's defeat in the 1987 provincial election, in which leader Larry Grossman lost his own seat. He served until 1990, when he was succeeded by Mike Harris following a leadership convention.

Jean Charest became interim leader of the federal Progressive Conservatives following the party's defeat in the 1993 election, in which Kim Campbell lost her own seat. At the next leadership convention in 1995, Charest was acclaimed to the full leadership of the party. Additionally, having subsequently become leader of the Quebec Liberal Party, Charest resigned as leader following the party's defeat in the 2012 provincial election, in which he lost his seat. As a result, Jean-Marc Fournier was named interim leader.

Joy MacPhail served as interim leader of the New Democratic Party of British Columbia from 2001 to 2003, following the party's defeat in the 2001 provincial election, in which Ujjal Dosanjh lost his seat. She served until Carole James was selected as the party's new leader in 2003.

John Tory was defeated in the 2007 Ontario election, in which he ran in a different seat than the one where he was an incumbent. He stayed on as leader, despite facing some internal criticism — notably, a leadership review in 2008 gave him just 66.9 per cent support, the very same result which Joe Clark had deemed not sufficient to justify staying on as leader of the federal Progressive Conservatives in 1983. Bob Runciman served as interim parliamentary leader, but Tory retained the actual leadership of the party. Tory eventually resigned in 2009, after losing a by-election in Haliburton—Kawartha Lakes—Brock, and Runciman became the party's interim leader.

Bob Rae was named interim leader of the Liberal Party following the 2011 election, in which his party's previous leader, Michael Ignatieff, was defeated in his own riding.

Internal disorganization
In one case, Ontario Liberal Party interim leader W.E.N. Sinclair led his party through two consecutive elections in 1926 and 1929. He was interim leader from 1923 to 1930 since, due to the party's state of disorganization, there was no leadership convention held in that period to choose a successor to Wellington Hay. When a convention was finally held, Sinclair drew little support and withdrew before balloting began. He was succeeded by future Premier Mitchell Hepburn.

Leader accepts another position

Sometimes an outgoing leader decides to resign immediately in order to ensure party unity, because they have accepted an appointment or chosen to stand as a candidate for (or been elected to) another position.

Following the resignation of Daniel Johnson as leader of the Quebec Liberal Party in 1998, the prospect of Jean Charest becoming the party's new leader began to attract widespread public support. When Charest subsequently decided to stand as a candidate, he resigned as leader of the federal Progressive Conservatives, and Elsie Wayne became the party's interim leader.

Similarly, Thomas Kennedy served as interim leader of the Progressive Conservative Party of Ontario from 1948 to 1949, after George Drew resigned to contest the leadership of the federal Progressive Conservatives.

Leave of absence
From November 1954 to February 1955 William Earl Rowe acted as interim Leader of the Opposition when Progressive Conservative leader George A. Drew was in poor health following an attack of meningitis. Drew returned but later fell ill again, and Rowe again became as interim leader of the opposition in August 1956. Drew resigned in September and Rowe remained interim opposition leader until December when John Diefenbaker was elected party leader.

An interim leader, Nycole Turmel was appointed to lead the NDP on July 28, 2011, while Jack Layton was on a medical leave of absence to fight cancer. She continued in the position following Layton's death on August 22, 2011.

Political circumstances
Following the 2008–2009 Canadian parliamentary dispute, Stéphane Dion's continued leadership of the federal Liberals was felt to be an impediment to the party's popular support, but with a situation where the party had to be almost immediately prepared to either take over the government or face an election, many party members felt that the party did not have the time to go through a conventional leadership race. After some internal debate, leadership candidates Dominic LeBlanc and Bob Rae withdrew from the race, and the only remaining candidate, Michael Ignatieff, was immediately named interim leader. His leadership was formally ratified at a party convention in May 2009.

Personal circumstances
Pam Barrett resigned the leadership of the Alberta New Democrats in 2000, but for health reasons she opted not to retain the leadership until her successor could be chosen, instead announcing that her resignation was effective immediately. Raj Pannu was named interim leader, and was then acclaimed leader at the subsequent convention. Brian Mason, who succeeded Pannu to the leadership in 2004, also took the position of interim leader before securing the full leadership at convention.

Danny Williams resigned the leadership of the Progressive Conservative Party of Newfoundland and Labrador, similarly choosing to step down immediately rather than serving until a leadership convention, and Deputy Premier Kathy Dunderdale was elevated to the interim leadership of the party and to the premiership.

Federal interim party leaders

Conservative Party of Canada (historic)
Hugh Guthrie October 11, 1926 – October 12, 1927 (following Arthur Meighen's loss of his seat in the general election and resignation)
Richard Hanson May 14, 1940 – November 12, 1941 (following Robert James Manion's loss of his seat in the general election and resignation)

Progressive Conservative Party of Canada
William Earl Rowe November 29, 1956 – December 14, 1956 (following George A. Drew's resignation)
Erik Nielsen February 19, 1983 – June 11, 1983 (following Joe Clark's resignation)
Jean Charest December 14, 1993 – April 29, 1995 (following Kim Campbell's loss of her seat in the general election and resignation and his own ratification as permanent leader)
Elsie Wayne April 2, 1998 – November 14, 1998 (following Jean Charest's resignation to seek the leadership of the Quebec Liberal Party)

Canadian Alliance
Deborah Grey March 27, 2000 – July 8, 2000 (following the creation of the party, until its first leadership convention)
John Reynolds December 12, 2001 – March 20, 2002 (following the resignation of Stockwell Day)

Conservative Party of Canada
John Lynch-Staunton December 8, 2003 – March 20, 2004 (following the creation of the party, until its first leadership convention)
Rona Ambrose November 5, 2015—May 27, 2017 (following the resignation of Stephen Harper after losing the 2015 federal election, until the election of Andrew Scheer as party leader)
Candice Bergen February 2, 2022—September 10, 2022 (following the removal as leader of Erin O'Toole, until the election of Pierre Poilievre as party leader)

Green Party of Canada
Harry Garfinkle 1997 (following the abrupt resignation of Wendy Priesnitz over differences between the party's stated goals and the beliefs of its membership)
Chris Bradshaw 2001 – February 2003 (following the resignation of Joan Russow)
Jo-Ann Roberts November 4, 2019 – October 3, 2020 (following the resignation of Elizabeth May after the 2019 Canadian federal election)
Amita Kuttner November 24, 2021 – November 19, 2022 (following the resignation of Annamie Paul after the 2021 Canadian federal election)

Liberal Party of Canada
Daniel Duncan McKenzie February 17, 1919 – August 7, 1919 (following the death of Sir Wilfrid Laurier)
Bill Graham March 19, 2006 – December 1, 2006 (following the resignation of Paul Martin)
Michael Ignatieff December 10, 2008 – May 2, 2009  (following the resignation of Stephane Dion, until being elected permanent leader)
Bob Rae May 25, 2011 – April 13, 2013 (following the resignation of Ignatieff who lost his seat in the 2011 federal election)

Co-operative Commonwealth Federation
J. S. Woodsworth August 1, 1932 – July 1933 (acting leader from founding meeting until its first national convention a year later when he was elected permanent leader)

New Democratic Party
Nycole Turmel July 28, 2011 – March 24, 2012 (following the death of Jack Layton)

Bloc Québécois
 Gilles Duceppe January 16, 1996 – February 17, 1996 (following the resignation of Lucien Bouchard after losing the Quebec 1995 referendum)  
 Vivian Barbot May 2, 2011 – December 11, 2011 (following the resignation of Gilles Duceppe)
 Rhéal Fortin October 22, 2015 – March 18, 2017 (following the resignation of Gilles Duceppe)
 Mario Beaulieu June 13, 2018 – January 17, 2019 (following the resignation of Martine Ouellet after losing a leadership review)

Provincial and territorial interim party leaders

British Columbia Liberal Party
 Thomas Dufferin Pattullo October 1928 – January 1929 (following the resignation of John Duncan MacLean)
 Rich Coleman August 4, 2017 – February 3, 2018 (following the resignation of Christy Clark, after losing the 2017 provincial election)

Green Party of British Columbia
 Tom Hetherington 2000 (following the resignation of Stuart Parker for losing the leadership vote) 
 Christopher Bennett 2007 (following the resignation of Adriane Carr) 
 Adam Olsen 2013-2015 (following the resignation of Jane Sterk)

Green Party of Prince Edward Island
 Darcie Lanthier 2012 (following the resignation of Sharon Labchuk)

Prince Edward Island Liberal Party
 Lorne Bonnell 1965
 Bennett Campbell 1978 (following the retirement of Alexander B. Campbell, until his election as permanent leader)
 Gilbert Clements 1981 (following Bennett Campbell's resignation)
 Ron MacKinley 2000-2003 (MacKinley was the only member of the party elected in the 2000 provincial election)
 Robert Mitchell 2019 (following Wade MacLauchlan's resignation after losing his seat in the 2019 provincial election)
 Sonny Gallant 2019 - (following Robert Mitchell's resignation as interim leader)

Interim parliamentary leaders
In certain circumstances, a party may also have an interim parliamentary leader who is not officially the party's leader, particularly when the party leader is not a sitting member of the legislature. Herb Gray served as parliamentary leader of the Liberals following the selection of Jean Chrétien as leader in 1989, until Chrétien could run in a by-election to enter the House of Commons. Similarly, Bob Runciman served as parliamentary leader of the Ontario Progressive Conservative Party following the 2007 election, in which party leader John Tory lost his seat in the legislature. He became the party's full interim leader in 2009 after Tory was defeated in an attempt to re-enter the Legislative Assembly in a by-election.

Bill Graham served as interim parliamentary leader of the Liberals in early 2006, while outgoing party leader Paul Martin was still sitting as an MP and retained the formal leadership of the party. After this situation created some media confusion over which man would lead the party into an election if one were to occur, Martin stepped down as party leader in March, and Graham assumed the full interim leadership until Stéphane Dion was selected as leader in December.

Louis Plamondon became interim parliamentary leader of the Bloc Québécois on June 2, 2011, at the beginning of the first session of the 41st Canadian Parliament, following the 2011 federal election and the defeat and resignation of BQ leader Gilles Duceppe, while Vivian Barbot succeeded Duceppe as interim president of the BQ.

Major James Coldwell became parliamentary leader of the Co-operative Commonwealth Federation in October 1940, following the stroke and incapacitation of party leader J. S. Woodsworth, who retained the title of "honorary president" (leader). Coldwell was officially elected leader in July 1942, several months following Woodsworth's death.

References

Political terminology in Canada
Government occupations